James D. Ployhar (September 22, 1926 – January 2, 2007) was an American composer, music educator, and film producer. He was responsible for many pieces of music well known to American band students, including "Cool Blues for Trumpets", "March of the Irish Guard", "Crazy Clock", and "Korean Folk Song Medley".

Biography
Ployhar attended Valley City State University in Valley City, North Dakota, and was initiated into the Beta Rho chapter of Phi Mu Alpha Sinfonia music fraternity in 1952. He earned a master's degree from the University of Northern Colorado, and did doctoral study at UCLA.
 Ployhar was president of the VCSC Alumni Association from 1975 to 1976 and a member of the V-500 Foundation. On May 20, 1977, he was given the Distinguished Alumnus Award at Valley City State University.

A public school teacher of nineteen years, Ployhar was a prolific writer in the field of music education and authored Contemporary Band Course. He received the citation of excellence by the executive committee of the National Band Association.

He founded the Fargo Big Band All-Stars, a musical group that frequently performed at the historic Fargo Theatre, and he co-produced the 1994 Disney film Iron Will.

Ployhar died January 2, 2007, in Fargo, North Dakota

References

1926 births
People from Fargo, North Dakota
2007 deaths
Musicians from North Dakota
Valley City State University alumni
20th-century American composers